Hugo Claudio Vallejo Avilés (born 15 February 2000) is a Spanish footballer who plays as a right winger for SD Ponferradina, on loan from Real Valladolid.

Club career
Born in Granada, Andalusia, Vallejo joined Málaga CF's youth setup in 2015, from Granada CF. He made his senior debut with the reserves on 28 October 2018, coming on as a half-time substitute in a 0–1 Segunda División B away loss against UD Almería B.

Vallejo scored his first senior goal on 25 November 2018, netting the winner in a 2–1 home defeat of Atlético Sanluqueño CF. He made his first team debut the following 6 January, replacing Dani Pacheco in a 0–3 loss at CF Reus Deportiu in the Segunda División championship.

On 14 January 2020, Málaga announced the transfer of Vallejo to Real Madrid, and he was loaned to Deportivo de La Coruña for the remainder of the season eleven days later. Upon returning, he was assigned to the reserves in the third division.

On 25 August 2021, Vallejo signed a three-year contract with Real Valladolid, recently relegated to the second division. On 1 September of the following year, after featuring rarely, he was loaned to SD Ponferradina for one year.

References

External links

2000 births
Living people
Footballers from Granada
Spanish footballers
Association football wingers
Segunda División players
Segunda División B players
Atlético Malagueño players
Málaga CF players
Real Madrid Castilla footballers
Deportivo de La Coruña players
Real Valladolid players
SD Ponferradina players
Spain youth international footballers